
ERCC2, or XPD is a protein involved in transcription-coupled nucleotide excision repair.

The XPD (ERCC2) gene encodes for a 2.3-kb mRNA containing 22 exons and 21 introns. The XPD protein contains 760 amino acids and is a polypeptide with a size of 87kDa. Defects in this gene can result in three different disorders: the cancer-prone syndrome xeroderma pigmentosum complementation group D, photosensitive trichothiodystrophy, and Cockayne syndrome.

Just like XPB, XPD is a part of human transcriptional initiation factor TFIIH and has ATP-dependent helicase activity. It belongs to the RAD3/XPD subfamily of helicases.

XPD is essential for the viability of cells. Deletion of XPD in mice is lethal for developing embryos.

Consequences of mutations in ERCC2 

The ERCC2/XPD protein participates in nucleotide excision repair and is used in unwinding the DNA double helix after damage is initially identified.  Nucleotide excision repair is a multi-step pathway that removes a wide range of different damages that distort normal base pairing.  Such damages include bulky chemical adducts, ultraviolet-induced pyrimidine dimers, and several forms of oxidative damage.  Mutations in the ERCC2/XPD gene can lead to various syndromes, either xeroderma pigmentosum (XP), trichothiodystrophy (TTD) or a combination of XP and TTD (XPTTD), or a combination of XP and Cockayne syndrome (XPCS).  TTD and CS both display features of premature aging.  These features may include sensorineural deafness, retinal degeneration, white matter hypomethylation, central nervous system calcification, reduced stature, and cachexia (loss of subcutaneous fat tissue).  XPCS and TTD fibroblasts from ERCC2/XPD mutant human and mouse show evidence of defective repair of oxidative DNA damages that may underlie the segmental progeroid (premature aging) symptoms (see DNA damage theory of aging).

ERCC2 and Nucleotide Excision Repair 

The protein named XPD is expressed under the directions of the ERCC2 gene. The XPD protein is an indispensable part of the general transcription factor IIH (TFIIH) complex, which is a group of proteins.  The two vital functions of the TFIIH complex are gene transcription and repairing damaged DNA. With the help of gene transcription, the TFIIH complex is able to control the functioning of many different genes in the body and the XPD protein acts as a stabilizer. XPB is another protein in the general transcription factor IIH (TFIIH) complex and is made from the ERCC3 gene, which works in coordination with XDP protein to commence the process of gene transcription.

Ultraviolet rays emerging from the sun, various hazardous chemicals, harmful radiations, are all known parameters for the sabotage of the DNA. A normal and healthy cell has the capability to fix the DNA damages before the problems begin due to the damaged DNA. Cells use nucleotide excision repair to fix damaged DNA. As a part of the process, the double-stranded DNA that encircles the damage is separated by the TFIIH complex. The XPD protein acts as a helicase and helps with the nucleotide excision repair process by binding to the specific regions of DNA and by unwinding the two DNA spiral strands. This exposes the damaged protein which allows the other proteins to remove the damaged section and replace the impaired area with the correct DNA.

ERCC2 and xeroderma pigmentosum 
Xeroderma pigmentosum (XP) is associated with the lack of DNA repair mechanism and high susceptibility of cancer. A slight insufficiency in the DNA repair mechanism may result in the development of cancer.  Some cancers have been recognized with the help of the relation between the single nucleotide polymorphism and genes. The XPD protein produced by the ERCC2 gene plays an important role in the process of transcription and cell death and is also known for nucleotide excision repair pathway. Various literature studies have reviewed the correlation between polymorphisms in ERCC2 and reduced DNA repair efficiency and their influence on the development of the cancers as well as interaction with environmental exposures.

The second most common cause of xeroderma pigmentosum in the United States are due to mutations in ERCC2 gene, more than twenty-five of which have been observed in people with this disease. The xeroderma pigmentosum is caused when the ERCC2 gene prevents the TFIIH complex from repairing the damaged DNA constructively.

Consequently, all the deformity collects inside the DNA, sabotaging the repair mechanism and results in the cancerous or dead cells. Thus, the people suffering from xeroderma pigmentosum are highly sensitive to the ultraviolet rays from the sunlight due to the DNA repair problems.

So, when ultraviolet rays harm the genes, the cell grows and divides in an uncontrolled fashion and is highly prone to be cancerous. Xeroderma pigmentosum have high risk of developing cancer in skin and eyes as they are the areas mostly exposed to sun. Xeroderma pigmentosum caused by ERCC2 mutations is associated with the numerable developmental neurological malfunctioning which includes; hearing loss, poor coordination, mobility issues, lack of intellectual abilities, difficulties in talking, walking, swallowing the food and seizures.

Researchers suspect that these neurological abnormalities are due to the accumulation of DNA damage despite the brain not being exposed to ultraviolet rays. Other factors might cause the DNA damage in nerve cells as well.

Interactions 

ERCC2 has been shown to interact with:
 ERCC5, 
 GTF2H1, 
 GTF2H2,  and
 XPB.

Interactive pathway map

See also 
Excision repair cross-complementing

References

Further reading

External links 
  GeneReviews/NIH/NCBI/UW entry on Xeroderma Pigmentosum
 

Oncogenes